The  Chicago Cardinals season was the 29th season in franchise history. The Cardinals won the Western division on the final weekend at Wrigley Field over the cross-town Bears, and appeared in the NFL championship game for the second consecutive year. The defending champions lost 7–0 to the Eagles in a snowstorm in Philadelphia.

The Cardinals scored 395 points (32.9 per game) in 1948, the most in the ten-team NFL, and the second most all-time in a 12-game season. They also led the league in offensive yards, yards per play, rushing yards and rushing touchdowns. The team's plus-169 point-differential remains the best in franchise history.

The 1948 NFL season produced more points-per-game per team than any other season, and according to Cold Hard Football Facts: "Jimmy Conzelman's Chicago Cardinals were the best of the bunch. They led the NFL in scoring that year (32.9 [points-per-game]) and they produced what was probably the greatest four-week stretch of offense in pro football history. From October 17 to November 7, the 1948 Cardinals beat the Giants 63–35; the Boston Yanks, 49–27; the L.A. Rams 27–22; and the Lions, 56–20. That's a four-week average of 48.8 [points-per-game] for those of you keeping score at home.

"Yes, turnovers were common in 1948, so maybe that fact made life easier for offense. The Cardinals, for example, picked off 23 passes in 12 games. But they scored just two defensive touchdowns all year, while adding four on special teams. Mostly, they ripped off touchdowns, a remarkable 47 on offense. They kicked a mere eight field goals.

"Mostly, the offense was virtually unstoppable and it didn't settle often for the cheap, soccer-style field goals that pad offensive team totals today."

The Cardinals had three players in the top six in rushing in 1948: halfbacks Charley Trippi (690 yards), and Elmer Angsman (638), and fullback/linebacker/placekicker Pat Harder (554). Harder led the league in scoring in 1948, with 110 points (6 rushing touchdowns, 7 field goals, and 53 extra points). He was named the league's MVP by United Press International.

This was the Cardinals' last playoff game until 1974, although they did win the third place Playoff Bowl in Miami over Vince Lombardi's Green Bay Packers in January 1965. The Cardinals' next appearance in an NFL championship game was sixty years later in Super Bowl XLIII in January 2009.

Offseason

NFL draft

Regular season

Schedule

Standings

Roster

Postseason

NFL Championship Game

The 1948 NFL championship game was the sixteenth NFL title game and a rematch of the previous year's game between the Chicago Cardinals of the Western Division and the Eastern Division's Philadelphia Eagles. It was played at Philadelphia's Shibe Park on December 19 and the host Eagles won 7–0 in the snow.

Awards and records
Led NFL, Points Scored, 395 
Led NFL, Total Yards Gained, 4,705 
Led NFL, Rushing Yards, 2,560 
Pat Harder, NFL Scoring Leader, 110 points

References

Cardinals on Pro Football Reference
 Cardinals on jt-sw.com

Chicago Cardinals
Arizona Cardinals seasons
Chicago Card